Michèle Alayrangues Halter (born 15 May 1947) is a French sprinter. She competed in the women's 4 × 100 metres relay at the 1968 Summer Olympics.

References

External links
 

1947 births
Living people
Athletes (track and field) at the 1968 Summer Olympics
French female sprinters
Olympic athletes of France
Universiade gold medalists for France
Universiade medalists in athletics (track and field)
Medalists at the 1967 Summer Universiade
Olympic female sprinters
20th-century French women